Jean-Eudes Aholou (born 20 March 1994) is an Ivorian professional footballer who plays as a midfielder for Ligue 1 club Strasbourg, and the Ivory Coast national team.

Club career
Aholou started his career with Lille, he was with Lille between 2012 and 2015 but didn't play a match; though he was on the bench seven times in all competitions. He did, however, feature 49 times for Lille B and scored 4 goals; he played 20 times in his last season with Lille B as they were relegated to Championnat de France Amateur 2.

In 2015 Aholou joined Championnat National club Orléans. He scored twice in 32 matches in his debut season as Orléans won promotion to Ligue 2. In France's second tier, Aholou participated in 20 encounters and scored 3 goals.

On 16 January 2017, Aholou joined Ligue 2 team Strasbourg, signing a four-and-a-half year contract.

On 25 July 2018, Aholou joined Monaco on a five-year deal. On 16 July 2021, he returned to Strasbourg on a second loan with an option to buy, after spending the 2020–21 season at Strasbourg as well.

International career
Aholou has represented Ivory Coast at U17 and U23 level. He played in all four of Ivory Coast's matches at the 2011 FIFA U-17 World Cup in Mexico. Four years later, Aholou debuted for the U23s in the 2015 Toulon Tournament. He also played for the U23s in a 5–1 friendly loss against France U21.

Aholou is of Togolese descent through his father, but chose to represent Ivory Coast at an international level. He made his debut against Togo in a 2–2 friendly tie on 24 March 2018.

Personal life
Aholou's father was a Togolese footballer who played, and then settled in the Ivory Coast. He is the brother of the Togolese international footballer Roger Aholou.

Career statistics

Club
.

Honours 
Saint-Étienne

 Coupe de France runner-up: 2019–20

References

1994 births
Living people
Footballers from Abidjan
Association football midfielders
Ivorian footballers
Ivory Coast international footballers
Ivorian people of Togolese descent
Ligue 1 players
Ligue 2 players
Championnat National players
Championnat National 2 players
Lille OSC players
US Orléans players
RC Strasbourg Alsace players
AS Monaco FC players
AS Saint-Étienne players
Ivorian expatriate footballers
Ivorian expatriate sportspeople in Monaco
Ivorian expatriate sportspeople in France
Expatriate footballers in France
Expatriate footballers in Monaco
Ivory Coast youth international footballers